Nuestra Señora de la Asunción (Spanish for Our Lady of the Assumption) may refer to:

 Basilica of la Asunción de Nuestra Señora (Colmenar Viejo), a Gothic basilica located in Colmenar Viejo, Spain
 Cathedral of Córdoba, Argentina
 Our Lady of the Assumption Co-Cathedral, Baracoa, Cuba
 Church of Nuestra Señora de la Asunción (Meco), a church and parish located in Meco, Spain
 Church of Nuestra Señora de la Asunción (Valdemoro), a church located in Valdemoro, Spain
 Colegiata de Nuestra Señora de la Asunción, Catholic church built in the sixteenth century in the town of Osuna, in Andalusia, Spain
 Mission Nuestra Señora de la Asunción de Zía, a Spanish mission established 1706 in the area that is now New Mexico
 Nuestra Señora de la Asunción, Bujalance, a Roman Catholic church in Bujalance, Andalusia, southern Spain
 Santa Maria Church, the parish church of Santa Maria in Ilocos Sur province, Philippines
 Universidad Católica "Nuestra Señora de la Asunción", private pontifical university of Catholic obedience in Asunción, Paraguay

See also 
 Church of Nuestra Señora de la Asunción (disambiguation)